Treffpunkt Flughafen (German for "Airport Meeting Point") is an East German television series produced by the DEFA-Studio für Spielfilme on behalf of Fernsehen der DDR in 1985 and 1986. The show follows the life and adventures of the crew of an Il-62 operated by the East German airline Interflug. Filming locations were in East Germany, Vietnam, the People's Republic of Angola, and Cuba, among others.

Cast
 Günter Naumann — Werner Steinitz (Captain)
 Walter Plathe — Paul Mittelstedt (Copilot)
 Jürgen Zartmann — Jürgen Graf (Navigator)
 Günter Schubert — Karlheinz Adler (Engineer)
 Regina Beyer — Karin Mittelstedt (Stewardess)
 Marijam Agischewa — Viola Vallentin (Stewardess)
 Pham Thi Thanh — Li Tam (Stewardess)

Episodes

DVD releases

Germany
ICESTORM Distribution Berlin GmbH released a four-disc DVD set of the complete series on May 9, 2010, for region 2. The video format is PAL (4:3) with audio in Dolby Digital 2.0.

See also
List of German television series

External links
 

1985 German television series debuts
1986 German television series endings
Aviation television series
Television in East Germany
German-language television shows